Haemodracon is a small genus of rare geckos from Socotra archipelago.

It contains the following species:
  — type species
 

The genus name is related to Dracaena cinnabari — the most famous tree of Socotra. It gives a red resin known as dragon's blood. The word Haemodracon is derived from the Latinized Greek haema-, meaning "blood", and dracon meaning "dragon".

References

 
Endemic fauna of Socotra
Lizard genera
Taxa named by William Roy Branch